San Vicente Centenario is a municipality in the Honduran department of Santa Bárbara.

Demographics
At the time of the 2013 Honduras census, San Vicente Centenario municipality had a population of 3,601. Of these, 70.85% were Mestizo, 26.35% White, 2.39% Black or Afro-Honduran, 0.39% Indigenous and 0.03% others.

References

Municipalities of the Santa Bárbara Department, Honduras